B. M. Institute of Engineering & Technology is an engineering college located at Raipur-Fazilpur Road, Sonepat, Haryana, Delhi NCR. The institute was established in 1999. It is one of the oldest in the region. It is affiliated to Guru Gobind Singh Indraprastha University,) Delhi and is approved by the AICTE. It offers degrees including B.Tech., M.B.A. and B.B.A. The institute has separate hostels for boys and girls on campus, and provides bus facility from all major routes of Delhi. It also has an alumni network of around 7000 students working round the globe in major engineering and management organizations. The institute is a Jain Minority Institute.

References

External links 

Universities and colleges in Haryana
Colleges of the Guru Gobind Singh Indraprastha University
1999 establishments in Haryana
Educational institutions established in 1999
Engineering colleges in Delhi